Gary Patterson (born 27 November 1972) is a former professional footballer who played in The Football League for Notts County, Shrewsbury Town, Wycombe Wanderers, Barnet and Chesterfield.

References

English footballers
Wycombe Wanderers F.C. players
Chesterfield F.C. players
Barnet F.C. players
Shrewsbury Town F.C. players
Notts County F.C. players
English Football League players
1972 births
Living people
Kingstonian F.C. players
Association football midfielders